John Ashe (1597–1658)  was an English clothier and politician who sat in the House of Commons at various times between 1640 and 1656.

Life
Ashe was the son of James Ashe of Freshford, Somerset and his wife Grace Pitt, daughter of Richard Pitt of Melcombe Regis. He entered the cloth trade and became on the "greatest clothier in his time". He came to the attention of the church authorities in the 1630s, associated with the "Beckington riots" against Alexander Huish, and the distribution of Puritan literature. He spent time in jail as an opponent of the ritualist side of Laudianism. In fact Ashe was important in distributing widely the News from Ipswitch of William Prynne, with Rice Boye.

In April 1640, Ashe was elected Member of Parliament for Westbury in the Short Parliament. He was re-elected MP for Westbury for the Long Parliament in November 1640. During the Commonwealth, Ashe received much favour from Oliver Cromwell, but could not be persuaded to be one of the king's judges.

Ashe pioneered new techniques in textile manufacturer and in 1650 brought Dutch technicians to Freshford to teach new methods to perfect the Spanish warp. By this innovation, the amount of cloth produced from an amount of wool was doubled, and Ashe profited accordingly.  He was elected MP for Somerset in 1654 for the First Protectorate Parliament and in 1656 for the Second Protectorate Parliament. On 19 January 1657, John Ashe proposed an amendment to the Speaker's debate congratulating Cromwell on surviving an assassination attempt and adding a hope that Cromwell "take upon him the government according to the ancient constitution", by which he intended the Crown.

Ashe died at the age of 61 leaving a landed estate valued at £6000 a year.

Family
Ashe married Elizabeth Davidson, daughter of Henry Davison of Freshford and his wife Anne Chivers of Quemerford, Wiltshire, and had a family. He was the brother of Edward Ashe MP for Heytesbury. His daughter Grace married the clothier Paul Methuen (1613–1667).

References

External links
Ashe Family

 

1597 births
1658 deaths
English MPs 1640 (April)
English MPs 1640–1648
English MPs 1648–1653
English MPs 1654–1655